Thomas Bonner Flanagan (November 5, 1923 – March 21, 2002) was an American university professor at the University of California at Berkeley and a novelist.

Biography
Flanagan was born in 1923 in Greenwich, Connecticut, to a homemaker mother and a dentist father. All of his grandparents had come to the United States from County Fermanagh, Ireland. He served in the United States Army during World War II. He graduated from Amherst College in 1945. He received his Master of Arts and Doctor of Philosophy degrees from Columbia University. From 1960 to 1978 he was Professor of English Literature at the University of California at Berkeley, specializing in Irish literature. He was a tenured Full Professor in the English Department at the Stony Brook University until his retirement.

Flanagan was also a successful novelist. His first novel, The Year of the French, won the National Book Critics Award for fiction in 1979 and was adapted into a TV series, which was broadcast in Ireland in 1982.

Personal life
In 1949, he married Jane Parker, a nurse; they had two children, writer Caitlin Flanagan and Ellen Flanagan Klavan. His son-in-law is writer Andrew Klavan.  He and his wife spent much of their time in Ireland. They lived in East Setauket, Long Island.

He died on March 21, 2002, at the age of 78 in Berkeley.

Works

Historical novels
 The Year of the French (1979);  (2004)
The Tenants of Time (1988)
The End of the Hunt (1995)

Non-fiction work
The Irish Novelists 1800–1850 (1958)

Legacy

The Archives and Special Collections at Amherst College holds his papers.

References

Sources
Thomas Flanagan on Irish writers website page

External links
 Thomas A. Flanagan (AC 1945) Papers at the Amherst College Archives & Special Collections

1923 births
2002 deaths
20th-century American novelists
Columbia University alumni
Amherst College alumni
Writers from Greenwich, Connecticut
University of California, Berkeley faculty
Writers from California
American historical novelists
American male novelists
American people of Irish descent
20th-century American male writers
Novelists from Connecticut
American atheists
United States Army personnel of World War II